Stillwater, New Zealand, may refer to:

 Stillwater, Auckland
 Stillwater, West Coast